= Stirnurags =

Neighbourhood of Jurmala, Latvia

Coordinates: 56°59′N 23°53′E

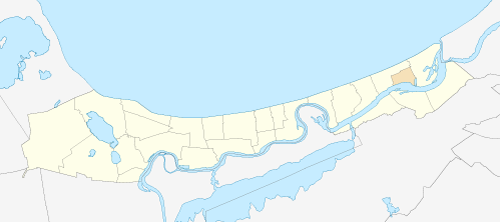
- Location in Jūrmala
- Country: Latvia
- City: Jūrmala

Area
  - Total: 1.5 km^{2} (0.58 sq mi)
- Elevation: 3 m (9.8 ft)

Population (2008)
  - Total: 370
  - Density: 246.7/km^{2} (639/sq mi)

Stirnurags is a residential area and neighbourhood of the city Jūrmala, Latvia.
